Armando Ramalho Correia de Almeida (born 15 June 1938) is a former Portuguese professional footballer.

Career statistics

Club

Notes

References

1938 births
Living people
Portuguese footballers
Association football goalkeepers
Segunda Divisão players
S.L. Benfica footballers
S.C. Covilhã players